Saulo Sarmiento (born 13 August 1987) is a Spanish acrobat and pole dancer from the Canary Islands. He performed with Cirque du Soleil and has appeared on Britain's Got Talent and La France a un incroyable talent.  He began gymnastics training at the age of 13.

Sarmiento speaks English, Spanish, and French. On fitness, Sarmiento reported to Queerty that he doesn't eat much before bed and mixes a cardio circuit with weights and yoga classes.

References

External links
 

Living people
Acrobats
Male acrobatic gymnasts
20th-century Spanish dancers
21st-century Spanish dancers
Spanish male dancers
Artists from the Canary Islands
Britain's Got Talent contestants
Participants in French reality television series
People from the Province of Las Palmas
Cirque du Soleil performers
1987 births